The Stafford 150 was a NASCAR K&N Pro Series East race held annually at Stafford Motor Speedway.

History
The race was scheduled to be 150 laps, but was extended to 153 laps,  due to NASCAR overtime.

Past winners

1987:  Race shortened to 82 laps, 41 miles (66.0 km) due to rain.
1994-1995, 1998 (2 of 2), 1999 (1 of 2), 2000 (1 of 2), 2002 (1 of 3) and 2016: Race extended due to an overtime finish.

References

External links
 http://hometracks.nascar.com/tracks/stafford
 

ARCA Menards Series East
Former NASCAR races
Recurring sporting events established in 1987
Recurring sporting events disestablished in 2016
Tolland County, Connecticut
1987 establishments in Connecticut
2016 disestablishments in Connecticut